Mellingen is a municipality in the Weimarer Land district of Thuringia, Germany.

References

Weimarer Land
Grand Duchy of Saxe-Weimar-Eisenach